The 1923 Oglethorpe Stormy Petrels football team represented Oglethorpe University in the sport of American football during the 1923 college football season. The 1923 season was not without its challenges. The Petrels did not do well in out of conference games, but amassed a decent conference record.

One game of note is the Mercer game. Mercer scored in the opening drive on an 85-yard touchdown run by Kid Cecil, the third longest in southern football history, but missed the extra point. Oglethorpe held Mercer for the whole game until almost the end of the fourth quarter. Oglethorpe scored, which brought the score to 7–6 for Oglethorpe. The tired Oglethorpe team knew the game was not over and tried to fight on. Mercer edged its way to the 15-yard line, but Oglethorpe was able to stop them as the time ran out, securing a Petrel win.

Schedule

References

Oglethorpe
Oglethorpe Stormy Petrels football seasons
Oglethorpe Stormy Petrels football